Eastern Kentucky Correctional Complex (EKCC) is a minimum and medium-security prison located in West Liberty, Kentucky.  It opened in February 1990 and had a prison population of 2,100 as of 2019.

References

About EKCC at Kentucky Department of Corrections' website.

Buildings and structures in Morgan County, Kentucky
Prisons in Kentucky
1990  establishments in Kentucky
West Liberty, Kentucky